Ilya Masodov (unknown; some sources state 1966) is a modern Russian writer.

Biography 

According to the publisher, Ilya Masodov was born in 1966 in Leningrad. He worked as a school teacher for a while and moved to Germany. There is no trustworthy evidence of the existence of the writer. An agent of the writer, Dmitry Volchek, stated that Masodov is a real person, but Volchek himself is not aware of the fate of the writer after 2003.

Debate over the identity of Masodov and the authorship 

There is a discussion about whether Ilya Masodov is a real writer. According to one theory, Masodov is a pseudonym derived from the names of other Russian writers such as "Ma-" for Mamleev, "-so-" for Sorokin and "-dov" for Radov (or less commonly, for "Dovlatov"). Other people consider the name as an anagram from von Sacher-Masoch and Marquis de Sade. It is also argued that Ilya Masodov is a project of Marusya Klimova or her publisher named Dmitry Volchek.

Style and language 

Some critics found Masodov uses the "pared to the bones" creative approach of Vladislav Krapivin. Masodov works between two genres, namely "Necrorealism" and "guro" or "vampire horror".

Works 
Trilogy of novels 2001:
 The Darkness of Your Eyes - a mocking and surreal story about a teenage vampire girl who travels to Black Moscow in order to raise Lenin from the dead.
 The Heat of Your Hands 
 The Sweetness of Your Soft Lips 

Additionally, a publisher of Masodov has stated that there is at least one unpublished novel by the author.

References 

Living people
1966 births
Russian writers
Occult writers
People whose existence is disputed